Twin Peaks: Music from the Limited Event Series is a soundtrack album to the Twin Peaks revival series. It was released on September 8, 2017, by Rhino Entertainment. 

Throughout the series, many well-known recording artists would perform studio renditions of their songs at the fictional Bang Bang Bar tavern (commonly referred to as "the Roadhouse"). Several of the bands were handpicked by director David Lynch himself, including Nine Inch Nails, Sharon Van Etten, and Eddie Vedder. The album contains the majority of the tracks featured in those performances, as well as several songs played diegetically throughout the season.

The score for the revival series was concurrently released as Twin Peaks: Limited Event Series Original Soundtrack.

Track listing

Charts

References

2017 soundtrack albums
Music of Twin Peaks
Rhino Entertainment soundtracks
Twin Peaks